Teresina–Senador Petrônio Portella Airport  is the airport serving Teresina, Brazil. Since December 22, 1999 it is named after Petrônio Portella Nunes (1925-1980) a former Mayor of Teresina, Governor of Piauí, Senator and Minister of Justice who had a key role in preparing the end of the Brazilian military government.

It is operated by CCR.

History
The airport was commissioned on September 30, 1967 and on December 23, 1974 it started being operated by Infraero.

The airport underwent major renovations between 1998 and 2001, including the passenger terminal, runway and the construction of a new control tower.

Previously operated by Infraero, on April 7, 2021 CCR won a 30-year concession to operate the airport.

Airlines and destinations

Passenger

Cargo

Access

See also

List of airports in Brazil

References

External links

Airports in Piauí
 
Airports established in 1967
1967 establishments in Brazil